Philip Johan von Strahlenberg (1676–1747) was a Swedish officer and geographer of German origin who made important contributions to the cartography of Russia.

Life
Strahlenberg was born in Stralsund, which then belonged to Sweden, and his original name was Philip Johan Tabbert. He joined the Swedish army in 1694 and was promoted captain in 1703. In 1707, he was ennobled and took the name von Strahlenberg.

Taking part in the Great Northern War, he was captured by the victorious Russian forces during the Battle of Poltava in 1709. As a prisoner of war, he was sent to Tobolsk, where he lived from 1711 to 1721. During this time, he studied the geography of Siberia and the anthropology, languages and customs of its native tribes. After returning to Stockholm in 1730, he published his book Das Nord- und Ostliche Theil von Europa und Asia (North and Eastern Parts of Europe and Asia) with the results of his studies. The book was well received and soon translated into English, French and Spanish.

As part of his book, Strahlenberg and Johan Anton von Matérn drew new maps of all of Russia - a formidable task in itself. He also suggested a new border between the continents of Europe and Asia in Russian territory. This border follows the peaks of the Urals, then branches off westwards along a minor mountain range, follows the hilly west bank of Volga river downstream to the 49th degree of latitude and Don river thereon to the Black Sea. Vasily Tatischev claimed that it was at his suggestion that Strahlenberg adopted the idea. See Boundaries between continents for the current political and geographical debates about the Europe-Asia border.

Strahlenberg's book also extensively deals with the languages and customs of the Tatars, Yakuts, Chuvash, Crimean Tatars, Uzbeks, Bashkirs, Kyrgyz, Turkmen Tatars and Mongols. He also compiled and published a Kalmyk-German dictionary, subsequently issued with French and English translations. In writing about the shamanic rituals of the indigenous peoples of Siberia, he noted their use of the fly agaric mushroom (Amanita muscaria).

In his later years, Strahlenberg wrote an extensive two-volume treatise on the history of Russia, which was published in French translation as Description Historique de l'Empire Russien (Historical Description of the Russian Empire) in 1757.

The asteroid (15766) Strahlenberg is named after him.

Works 
 Das Nord-und Ostliche Theil von Europa und Asia, 1730 (English translation reprinted in 1970 under the title Russia, Siberia, and Great Tartary)
 Description Historique de l'Empire Russien, 1757

See also

Johan Gustaf Renat

References

External links

Das Nord-und Ostliche Theil von Europa und Asia
Strahlenberg's description of shamanic rituals [only two small references, this link is misleading]

1676 births
1747 deaths
People from Stralsund
People from Swedish Pomerania
Swedish cartographers
Cartographers from the Russian Empire
Explorers from the Russian Empire
Turkologists
Swedish military personnel of the Great Northern War
Swedish prisoners of war
Prisoners of war held by Russia
Battle of Poltava
18th-century cartographers
Caroleans
Swedish people of German descent